Surana College established by GDA foundation in 1995, is one of the institutions in Bangalore in India, offering education in arts, science, information technology, commerce, and management. The college is located near Southend Circle in Bangalore City, Karnataka State. It also has a centre of post-graduate studies which offers degrees such as MBA, MCA and M.Sc. in psychology, located at Kengeri Satellite Town.

Courses offered
PU Courses
Part - I: Kannada / Hindi / Sanskrit/ French and English
Part - II: Science / Arts / Commerce

Science Stream
PCMB
PCMC

Commerce Stream
EBAC
BASM
SEBA
HEBA

Arts Stream
HEPPy

Degree Courses
 B.A
 History, Economics and Political Science
 History, Tourism and Journalism
 Journalism, Optional English and Psychology
 B.Sc
 Physics, Mathematics and Computer Science
 Chemistry, Botany and Bio-technology
 B.Com
 B.B.M
 B.C.A

Post Graduation Courses
The Post Graduate Departments of Surana College is based at Kengeri satellite town. The campus is 0.5 km from Kengeri Railway Station and 1 km from Kengeri bus stand.The MBA and MCA courses are AICTE approved Bangalore University affiliated courses and Psychology is a Bangalore University affiliated course.
 MBA
 MCA
 M.Sc.(Psychology)- Masters in Psychology at Surana College, is held at its Kengeri Campus. The Course is a two-year course affiliated to Bangalore University and focuses on applied skills. The department is also a research centre under Bangalore University and will be soon offering Ph.D guidance. The department has previously been headed by professors like, Dr. Sujendra Prakash, Dr. Y Balakrishna Acharya, Dr. Anitha Bhat and Dr. Anitha B S. The department is presently headed by Dr. Archana Bhat K.The direct admissions start from the month of January and the admissions University quota approximately starts from July. The total intake is 30 Management quota seats and 30 University seats. All students of Indian nationality with a degree in Psychology can apply for this course.

The Post Graduate department offers specialisations in the following streams:
1. Clinical Psychology
2. Organisational Psychology
3. Child Psychology
4. Rehabilitation Psychology
Dissertation and Internship along with regular field work and extension activities are compulsory components of the curriculum. Coaching for NET and KSLET examinations are included in the course duration . two students have cleared their KSLET examinations in 2018 and one student NET with JRF in 2019 and another cleared NET in 2019.

Diploma Courses
Diploma in Boutique Management and Jewellery Designing:

This module at the college intends to make students acquire fashion designing skills and management techniques. It also helps them to orient themselves for self-employment. As an Add-on the college is offering Jewellery designing which complements the dress designing.

References

Colleges in Bangalore
Colleges affiliated to Bangalore University
Educational institutions established in 1995
1995 establishments in Karnataka